Predmestje (transl. Suburb) was a Yugoslav jazz rock band formed in Ljubljana in 1977.

Soon after its formation the band released their debut album, Brez naslov, gaining prominence on the Yugoslav rock scene. By the time of the recording of the band's third studio album, keyboardist Andrej Pompe was the sole remaining original member, the rest of the lineup consisting of the former members of another Ljubljana-based jazz rock band, Izvir. The group disbanded in 1982, after recording four studio albums.

History

1977–1982
Predmestje was formed in Ljubljana in 1977 by Peter Gruden (guitar, vocals), Andrej Pompe (keyboards), Aleksander Malahovsky (saxophone), Gabriel Lah (bass guitar) and Janez Hvale (drums). During the same year the band released their debut jazz rock-oriented album, Brez naslov (Untitled), produced by Deče Žgur, through PGP-RTB.

In 1979 the band released their second studio album, Danes, včeraj in... (Today, Yesterday And...). The album featured new members Lado Jakša (saxophone), formerly of the band Sončna Pot (Sun Path), and Toni Dimnik (drums). All the songs on the album were written by Gruden and Pompe, and the album featured percussionist Uroš Šećerov as guest.

After the release of Danes, včeraj in..., the second lineup of the band split up. Andrej Pompe, remaining the sole original member, gathered a group of musicians who previously performed with another Ljubljana-based jazz rock band, Izvir. The new Predmestje lineup consisted of Andrej Pompe, vocalist and percussionist Marko Bitenc, guitarist Slavko Lebnar, bass guitarist Marjan Lebnar and drummer Andrej Petković. The new lineup recorded the album Hazard, produced by Čarli Novak and Braco Doblekar and released in 1980. The album featured similar jazz rock sound as their previous releases, with saxophonist Jernej Podboj as guest musician. After the album release, Predmestje often performed with singer Neca Falk as her backing band.

In 1982 Predmestje released their fourth studio album, Kamasutra, ending their activity soon after its release.

Discography

Studio albums
Brez naslov (1977)
Danes, včeraj in... (1979)
Hazard (1980)
Kamasutra (1982)

References

External links
Official website
Predmestje at Discogs
Predmestje at Prog Archives

Slovenian jazz-rock groups
Slovenian progressive rock groups
Yugoslav jazz-rock groups
Yugoslav progressive rock groups
Musical groups established in 1977
Musical groups disestablished in 1982